Tatsuma Ito was the defending champion but decided not to participate.
Michał Przysiężny defeated Hiroki Moriya 6–2, 6–3 in the final to win the title.

Seeds

Draw

Finals

Top half

Bottom half

References
 Main draw
 Qualifying draw

Men's Singles